Justin Rain (born October 27, 1981) is a Canadian First Nations actor. He is of Plains Cree descent.

Biography
Justin Rain was raised in Prince Albert, Saskatchewan, where he attended St. Mary's High School. Justin began abusing drugs in his youth which became problematic to the point that he overdosed several times and almost died. Of that point in his life he stated, "I was no honor student, I barely passed my classes. And it was all because I was running from who I was and the artist inside me." He began to distance himself from his friends and decided to pursue architecture where he attempted to get into British Columbia Institute of Technology. He eventually encountered other actors and began to appreciate the craft, ultimately deciding to go to Vancouver Academy of Dramatic Arts. Not long after, Justin earned his break in a very minor role in the movie The Twilight Saga: Eclipse.

Justin appeared in the indie film Two Indians Talking where he won Best Supporting Actor at the Winnipeg Aboriginal Film Festival. He was cast in a major role on the First Nations oriented Blackstone as Alan Fraser before joining the cast of Defiance as Quentin McCawley. He joined the cast of Fear the Walking Dead as Crazy Dog.

Filmography

References

External links
 

Living people
1981 births
First Nations male actors
Canadian male film actors
Canadian male television actors
Male actors from Vancouver